The Sciritae (Syrictæ, Syrictae, Sciritai or Skiritai) in Medieval bestiaries and Greek mythology were an Indian tribe with snake-like nostrils in place of a nose and bandy serpentine legs.

References 
Theoi Project- The Sciritae

Greek mythology
Medieval European legendary creatures